Chaïbia Talal (1929 – April 2, 2004)  was a Moroccan painter.

Biography
Chaïbia was born in Choutka, a small village near El Jadida, Morocco in 1929. At the age of 13, she was sent to Casablanca by her parents to marry a 70-year-old man. By the age of 14 she had given birth to a son, and by the age of 15 she had become a widow. When her husband died, she worked as a maid to earn money to support herself and her son. Talal was devoted to providing her son with an education, particularly academic literacy, although Talal herself would remain illiterate her entire life. After receiving art supplies from strangers in a dream, she was inspired to begin painting.

Her work was not initially well received in the Moroccan art world. Talal's son became a respected artist in his own right, and in 1965 introduced Talal to the director of the Museum of Modern Art in Paris, Pierre Gaudibert who was impressed by her work. Following this meeting, her works were exhibited at the Goeth-institute in Casablanca and the Museum of Modern Art in Paris in 1966.

Being a self-taught artist, Talal was known for breaking traditional boundaries. Her work is categorized as  "Outsider art" which illustrates unconventional ideas by members of non-traditional art movements. She was influenced by the works of artists from the CoBrA painting movement. Her work is also considered by some people, such as journalist Ahmed El Fassi, to be an naïve.

In 2015, Moroccan filmmaker Youssef Britel created biographical movie, entitled Chaïbia.  The film was written by David Villemin and Youssef Britel, and starring Saadia Azgoun as Chaïbia Talal. 

In 2004, Talal died of a heart attack in Casablanca at the age of 75.

Expositions
 1966 - Goethe-Institut, Casablanca - Morocco
 1966 - Solstice gallery, Paris - France
 1966 - Salon des Surindépendants, Musée d’Art Moderne, Paris - France
 1969 - "Ecole marocaine", Copenhagen - Denmark
 1969 - "Kunstkabinett", Frankfurt – Germany
 1970 - "Les Halles aux Idées", Paris – France
 1971 - "Dar America", Casablanca, Rabat, Marrakech, Fes, Tangier – Morocco
 1972 - Ventes aux enchères, Drouot, Paris – France
 1973 - "L’œil de Bœuf" gallery (CIPAC), Paris – France
 1974 - "Ivan Spence" gallery, Ibiza – Spain
 1974 - "Salon des Réalités Nouvelles", Paris – France
 1976 - "Biennale d’Art", Menton – France
 1977 - "Salon de Mai", Musée d’Art Moderne, Paris – France
1977 - "Salon des Réalités Nouvelles", Paris – France
 1980 - "Engel gallery", Rotterdam - Netherlands
 1980 - "Fondation Joan Miró", Barcelona – Spain

Awards
 Gold medal of the French Academic Society for Education and Encouragement. - March 2003.

Further reading
 The artist's voice - by Chaibia Talal
  Flamand, Alain. Regard sur la peinture contemporaine au Maroc. 221pp.

References

1929 births
2004 deaths
Moroccan women painters
Naïve painters
Moroccan artists
20th-century Moroccan painters
20th-century women artists